is a Buddhist temple in Kyoto, Japan. Founded by Kūya in 951, the Hondō was burned during the wars at the end of the Heian period. Its replacement of 1363, damaged during the Shintō revival at the beginning of the Meiji period, was restored in 1969. The temple house a number of statues of the Heian and Kamakura periods that have been designated Important Cultural Properties, including a Kamakura period image of its founder Kūya, as well as a Heian Jūichimen Kannon that is a National Treasure.

The temple was originally founded by Kūya as Saikō-ji (西光寺), but after the temple was renovated it received its present name from the priest Chushin. Generally, the temple's name is thought to be derived from the "six pāramitās" (六波羅蜜) requisite to supreme enlightenment. However, there is another theory that the name is derived from the area's old name, Rokuhara, after which was also named the Kamakura shogunate's secret police, the Rokuhara Tandai, whose offices were located nearby.

See also
 List of Buddhist temples in Kyoto
 List of National Treasures of Japan (sculptures)

References

External links

 Rokuharamitsu-ji homepage

Buddhist temples in Kyoto
Important Cultural Properties of Japan